Kerdeh Sara (also Romanized as Kerdeh Sarā) is a village in Lavandevil Rural District, Lavandevil District, Astara County, Gilan Province, Iran. At the 2006 census, its population was 1,168, in 274 families.

References 

Populated places in Astara County